William Abadie is a French actor best known for his roles in television series such as Gossip Girl (2007–2009), Sex and The City (1998-2004), Homeland (2013), The O.C. (2003-2007), Ugly Betty (2006-2010) and Emily in Paris (2020-present).

Biography
A graduate of L'École Claude Mathieu in Paris and The Lee Strasberg Theater Institute in New York City. William was honored with a Life Time Membership at the Actors Studio in 2000. Two years later, during the run of his self-produced Off-Broadway production of Dennis McIntyre's Modigliani (2002), he received positive reviews from The New York Times Theater Critic, Anita Gates. This milestone allowed him to attract established representation, which led to the start of his professional film and television career in the United States.

Abadie portrayed memorable characters in some of America's most acclaimed and iconic TV shows: Sex and the City, The O.C., ER, Entourage, Ugly Betty, 90210, Gossip Girl, Person of Interest, The Mentalist, Gotham, as well as the Golden Globe Award-winning show Homeland. On the silver screen Abadie has appeared in blockbusters including Resident Evil: Extinction and Shawn Levy's The Pink Panther, in which he plays opposite Steve Martin. Most recently William completed filming the second season of the Emmy and Golden-Globe nominated Netflix comedy-drama Emily in Paris, in which he plays the role of Antoine Lambert, the seductive and married owner of a French fragrance house.

In early 2022 William took on the role of Zed in the HBO Max reboot of Sex and The City: And Just Like That.

He is an accomplished Alpine snowboarder, triathlete, Ironman Lake Placid finisher, as well as a devoted marathon runner with dozens of races under his belt. Mr. Abadie resides between New York City and Paris.

Filmography

Film

Television

Video games

References

External links

21st-century French male actors
Living people
People from Saint-Raphaël, Var
French male film actors
French male television actors
French male stage actors
1977 births